Route 395 is a two-lane north/south highway located in the Abitibi-Témiscamingue region in Quebec, Canada. It starts at the junction of Route 117 in Cadillac (now part of Rouyn-Noranda) and ends at the junction of Route 397 in La Morandière-Rochebaucourt. It is briefly concurrent with Route 111 in Amos.

Municipalities along Route 395

 Rouyn-Noranda
 Preissac
 Sainte-Gertrude-Manneville
 Amos
 La Morandière-Rochebaucourt

See also
 List of Quebec provincial highways

References

External links 
 Provincial Route Map (Courtesy of the Quebec Ministry of Transportation) 
 Route 395 on Google Maps

395
Roads in Abitibi-Témiscamingue
Amos, Quebec
Transport in Rouyn-Noranda